Rønnes is a village in Grimstad municipality in Agder county, Norway. The village is located on the eastern shore of the Vikkilen bay, directly across the bay from the harbour of the town of Grimstad.

References

Villages in Agder
Grimstad